Kayle Leogrande (born March 29, 1977) is an American road racing cyclist, who is currently suspended from the sport. Leogrande was the 2006 winner of the United States National Amateur Criterium Championships, and spent two years with the infamous  team, having turned professional in 2005 with US domestic squad .

Leogrande was embroiled in a doping scandal in 2008, when it was alleged that he confessed his use of performance-enhancing drugs to a team staffer when competing at Superweek on July 26, 2007. Leogrande vigorously contested the charges brought against him by the United States Anti-Doping Agency (USADA), but was suspended for two years after a three-member arbitration panel concluded he had used EPO. Leogrande completed his suspension in late 2010, and announced his intention to compete again in a video released on YouTube.

In 2017 Leogrande was banned by USADA for a further 8 years after testing positive for seven substances at an amateur race.

Cycling career
Born in Grand Terrace, California, Leogrande turned professional in 2005 with the  team, and placed first in the Murrietta Stage Race. He reverted to amateur status in 2006 but won the United States National Criterium Championship in Downers Grove, Illinois. That result and his edgy persona as a muscular professional tattoo-artist with a studio in Upland, California earned Leogrande a return to the professional peloton in 2007, with Michael Ball's new  team. There he would race alongside three-time US Olympian Mariano Friedick and seven-time US National Champion Rahsaan Bahati. Under the guidance of then team-manager and confidant Joseph M. Papp, Leogrande promptly won the points classification at the 2007 Redlands Bicycle Classic, where he also finished second in the stage two criterium. He claimed three stages at the International Cycling Classic-Superweek in Wisconsin before finishing second overall. One of Leogrande's most impressive results of the season, however, was his top-10 finish at the CSC International, alongside a field that included European professionals: he took 8th.

Leogrande remained with a completely revamped  for the 2008 season, but attracted attention less for his riding than for allegations of doping and lawsuits. He collected a few podium finishes in minor races, but did climb to 6th in the USPRO National Criterium Championship, the professional version of which he'd won two years before.

Doping
Leogrande admitted doping began as early as 2006 via his eventual confession of purchasing EPO from Joseph M. Papp. Leogrande won the USA Cycling amateur criterium championship that year. In 2007, he joined  and began doping more regularly, and subsequently won the USA Cycling professional criterium championship. In July 2007, Leogrande was given a surprise drug test and he confided in Rock Racing souigneur Suzanne Sonye his uneasiness about testing positive due to his doping program. Leogrande's test came back negative, but Sonye reported his confession to USADA. Her testimony, and evidence provided by Papp (photographs of Leogrande with EPO and a handwritten note) led to Leogrande's demise. Leogrande entered a state of desperation, attempting to sue Sonye, Papp and Matthew Dicanio for defamation. The case against Sonye was dismissed and Leogrande was left financially crippled by the resulting verdict that he pay Sonye's attorney fees. During this time he hastily left an unused box of EPO in the refrigerator of an apartment he was moving out of. His landlady turned the sample over to the FDA, further cementing Leogrande's legacy. Travis Tygart, CEO of USADA, claims that without Leogrande's admission to Sonye, the USADA case against Lance Armstrong may have never happened.

In January 2008 Leogrande made headlines when he was revealed to be the anonymous rider filing a lawsuit against USADA, seeking to prevent the testing of his B-sample from a urinalysis taken at Superweek the previous year, which was thought to contain evidence of EPO. The A-sample had tested negative for performance-enhancing drugs but USADA claimed the right to test the B-sample regardless, already suspecting that Leogrande had doped. USADA refrained from testing the backup sample and the suit was dismissed – but the anti-doping agency still charged the rider with a doping violation.,

Later in the year, Leogrande filed another lawsuit, this time a defamation claim against former Rock Racing soigneur Suzanne Sonye. Leogrande also sued former professional cyclist Matt DeCanio for defamation. However, the USADA case against him went forward, and it was alleged that he had confessed his use of performance-enhancing drugs to Sonye when competing at Superweek on July 26, 2007. Though Leogrande denied the charges, he was suspended for two years after a three-member arbitration panel concluded he had in fact used EPO. Leogrande's "non-analytical" positive doping control was of note because it was based not matching A and B urine samples that showed traces of drug metabolites, but rather, sworn testimony from Sonye and Rock Racing team director Frankie Andreu and ancillary evidence such as cellphone records detailing calls between Leogrande and Papp plus their hand-written correspondence.

On August 28, 2017 it was announced that Leogrande had been suspended for a further eight years by the US Anti Doping Agency after testing positive for no fewer than seven substances (anti-estrogen drug – raloxifene, four Selective Androgen Receptor Modulators: ostarine, RAD140, LGD4033 and andarine, ibutamoren (a growth hormone-like factor), and GW1516 sulfone) at an amateur race earlier that year.

Other

Leogrande began tattooing in 1998, and in 2005 he acquired Classic Tattoo Parlor in Upland, California. For a time he also operated a second facility in Malibu. Leogrande states that as of February 2010, he is developing a proprietary line of cycling clothing and accessories to be released in September.

See also
 List of doping cases in cycling
 List of sportspeople sanctioned for doping offences

References

External links
 Official Site
 
 YouTube video announcing comeback
  Facebook Page

Living people
1977 births
American male cyclists
Doping cases in cycling